Cookie Wars is an American cooking competition television pilot that aired on Food Network on December 22, 2019. It was presented by television personality Jonathan Bennett; with cake artist Shinmin Li and cookie artist Andi Kirkegaard serving as judges.

The pilot featured three competing four-member teams of cookie bakers and sugar artists, with the final team winning $10,000.

Contestants

References

External links
 
 Home – Super Delicious  Television Production Company in Hollywood

2019 in American television
2019 television specials
Food reality television series
Cooking competitions in the United States
Food Network television specials
Television pilots not picked up as a series